The Sustainable Restaurant Association (SRA) is a not-for-profit, membership organisation, based in the United Kingdom, which aids food-service businesses to work towards sustainability in their sector and guides customers towards more sustainable choices. Since its launch in 2009, the organisation has expanded its remit beyond traditional restaurants to include cafes, contract catering and in-flight catering and expanded its geographical scope beyond the United Kingdom with a licence program that enables other territories to rapidly set up and deliver the program.

History 
The concept of an association to promote sustainability in the restaurant sector originated at the London-based consultancy, Good Business, and was developed by Simon Heppner and Giles Gibbons during 2008. The Garfield Weston Foundation, the Esmée Fairbairn Foundation and the Mark Leonard Trust provided funding and in 2009 the association launched with founder members Carluccios, Feng Sushi and Wahaca.

The organisation has continued to evolve and develop each year since then, increasing the number of restaurants it is working with from 52 at launch to over 12,000 in 2019. In 2012, Raymond Blanc became president of the association.

Sustainability framework and rating 

The challenge for many businesses working in food service was that while sustainability was seen as important, there was no consistency in the way it was defined or addressed. This created confusion the mind of customers about what constituted a sustainable restaurant, and a barrier to action for restaurateurs, who were unclear on where to focus attention.

One of the key aims of the organization has been to demystify sustainability in food service by creating a framework, covering all the elements, which go towards making a business more sustainable. This framework was developed in partnership with subject specific specialists such as RSPCA, Fair Trade, Soil Association, Compassion in World Farming and the Carbon Trust, as well as other organizations working more generally in the area of food service sustainability such as Sustain.
The framework is divided into three main sections: Environment, social and sourcing and forms the basis of the assessment process by which the SRA rates business.

Since 2009, the SRA has rated the sustainability performance of thousands of restaurants against this framework and awarded one, two or three stars and these now appear in restaurant windows and on menus as a signal to diners that the business is taking the issues seriously.

Campaigns 

In 2010 the SRA carried out research into food-waste in different types of restaurants, aiming to understand the scope of the issue and clarify what constituted plate-waste, spoilage and prep waste. The results indicated that on average restaurants were producing half a kilo of waste per diner and that 65% was prep waste, 30% plate waste and only 5% spoilage.
The publication of the results shed light on the issue for the first time, appearing in WRAP's report Understanding out of home consumer food waste, and prompted the SRA to develop the Too Good To Waste campaign, which encouraged diners to ask and restaurants to offer doggy boxes to take leftovers home.

References

External links 
 SRA Awards
Non-profit organisations based in the United Kingdom
2009 establishments in the United Kingdom
Food waste in the United Kingdom